Rudolf Dreßler (born 17 November 1940 in Wuppertal) is a German politician and diplomat.

Life 
In his childhood he lived in Sprockhövel and went to school in Wuppertal. He learned at a printer company and worked then for different newspapers. Since 1969 Dreßler is a member of political party Social Democratic Party of Germany (SPD). From 1969 to 1981 he was member of work council at German newspaper Westdeutsche Zeitung (WAZ). From 1874 to 1983 he was member of Printing and Paper Union. From 1980 to 2000 Dreßler was a member of German Bundestag.
In 1982, Dreßler became Parliamentary State Secretary at Federal Ministry of Labour and Social Affairs. On November 11 1997 he had a car accident near Bonn.
From 2000 to 2005 Dreßler was German ambassador in Israel. He married three times and has two children.

Awards 
 1988:Commanders Crosses of the Order of Merit of the Federal Republic of Germany

References

External links 

 
 Ein Parteitag muss den Richtungskampf beenden – interview i Freitag Nr. 25/2008

Members of the Bundestag for the Social Democratic Party of Germany
Members of the Bundestag 1980–1983
Members of the Bundestag 1983–1987
Members of the Bundestag 1987–1990
Members of the Bundestag 1990–1994
Members of the Bundestag 1994–1998
Members of the Bundestag 1998–2002
20th-century German politicians
German trade unionists
Parliamentary State Secretaries of Germany
Ambassadors of Germany to Israel

Commanders Crosses of the Order of Merit of the Federal Republic of Germany

People from Wuppertal

1940 births
Living people